Club de Fútbol Jaraíz is a football team based in Jaraíz de la Vera, in the autonomous community of Extremadura. Founded in 1972, they play in Primera Extremeña – Group 1, holding home matches at the Polideportivo Municipal Jaraíz de la Vera, with a capacity of 2,000 people.

Season to season

References

External links
Soccerway team profile

Football clubs in Extremadura
Association football clubs established in 1972
1972 establishments in Spain
Sport in Cáceres, Spain